Stavrodromi ( meaning crossroads) is a village and a community in Achaea, Greece. The community consists of the villages Stavrodromi, Panousaiika, Rachi and Xirochori. The Greek National Road 33 (Patras - Tripoli) runs through the village. In 2011 Stavrodromi had a population of 153 for the village and 278 for the community. Stavrodromi was the seat of the municipality of Tritaia.

Population

External links
 Stavrodromoi GTP Travel Pages

See also

List of settlements in Achaea

References

Populated places in Achaea